Zachary Harry Dearnley (born 28 September 1998) is an English professional footballer who plays as a winger for Guiseley.

Club career

Early career
Born in Sheffield, Dearnley began his career with Manchester United. He was on the substitutes bench in May 2017 for their final day Premier League match with Crystal Palace. During the 2018–19 season under José Mourinho, Dearnley trained with the club's senior squad in the build-up to a UEFA Champions League tie with Juventus. 

On 31 January 2019, Dearnley was loaned to EFL League Two side Oldham Athletic. He made his professional debut on 9 February against Crawley Town, scoring Oldham's second goal in a 3–0 victory. Dearnley's loan was terminated on 30 April due to injury after making nine appearances. On 7 June 2019, it was announced that Dearnley would leave United following the expiration of his contract on 30 June. In August, he had a trial with Rotherham United.

On 19 November 2019, Dearnley joined North West Counties Football League Division One South side New Mills. He made his debut later that day against Ellesmere Rangers, his only appearance for the club.

Return to Oldham Athletic
In January 2020 he returned to Oldham Athletic, signing a permanent contract until the end of the 2019–20 season. In June 2020 he signed a new two-year contract. On 27 January 2022, Dearnley had his contract terminated by mutual consent.

Non-league football
On 31 January 2022, Dearnley joined National League club FC Halifax Town on a free transfer. After playing for Buxton, he signed for Liversedge in September 2022. On 14 December 2022, Dearnley signed for Northern Premier League Premier Division side Guiseley.

International career
Dearnley represented England at U16 and Schools U18 level.

Career statistics

References

1998 births
Living people
Footballers from Sheffield
English footballers
England youth international footballers
Association football wingers
Manchester United F.C. players
Oldham Athletic A.F.C. players
New Mills A.F.C. players
FC Halifax Town players
English Football League players
North West Counties Football League players
Buxton F.C. players
Liversedge F.C. players
Guiseley A.F.C. players